T4 or T-4 may refer to:

Airports and airlines
 Heathrow Terminal 4
 Tiyas Military Airbase, also known as the T-4 Airbase

Biology and medicine
 T4 phage, a bacteriophage
 Thyroxine (T4), a form of thyroid hormone
 the T4 spinal nerve
 the fourth thoracic vertebrae of the vertebral column 
 A non-small cell lung carcinoma staging for a type of tumour
 A CD4 + T lymphocyte
 T4: an EEG electrode site according to the 10-20 system

Entertainment
 T4 (Channel 4), the former daytime teen-aimed slot on Channel 4 in the UK
 Terminator Salvation, sometimes referred to as Terminator 4
 Transformers: Age of Extinction, the fourth film in the live-action Transformers film series

Software and video games
 Text Template Transformation Toolkit, a technology developed by Microsoft
 Tekken 4, a 2001 fighting game

Rail transport
 Eastern Suburbs & Illawarra Line, a Sydney Trains railway service
 Île-de-France tramway Line 4
 T4 (Istanbul Tram)

Vehicles
 Dayton-Wright T-4, a 1918 American light, single-seat reconnaissance aircraft
 Kawasaki T-4, a Japanese aircraft
 Soyuz T-4, a spatial mission
 Sukhoi T-4, a Soviet aircraft
 Tatra T4, a 1967 Czechoslovakian tram
 Thaden T-4, a 1930s American four-seat all-metal cabin monoplane
 Volkswagen Transporter series IV van
 a model of the OS T1000 train of the Oslo Metro
 Model T4 Cunningham experimental armored car, later the M1 Armored car

Weapons and explosives
 T-4 Atomic Demolition Munition, a small tactical nuclear bomb
 G7e/T4, a Falke German torpedo
 The Italian name for the high explosive RDX

Other uses
Great East Road, a road in Zambia
 Lockheed Martin's High beta fusion reactor prototype, called T4
 A T4 slip, a tax return form used in income taxes in Canada
 Aktion T4, Nazi Germany's mass-murder of the mentally and physically disabled
 Normal space in topology
 Version 4 of Traveller role-playing game
 T4, one of several fluorescent-lamp formats
 A tornado intensity rating on the TORRO scale
 SPARC T4, a microprocessor introduced by Oracle Microelectronics in 2011

See also
 The Four T's (disambiguation)
 4T (disambiguation)
 TTTT